Al Mina, Tyre is a spectacular and more familiar Roman site near Tyre.  
Al-Mina (Arabic: "the port") is the modern name given by Leonard Woolley to an ancient trading post on the Mediterranean coast of northern Syria, in the estuary of the Orontes River, near Samandağ, in Hatay Province of Turkey.

Archaeology
The site was excavated in 1936 by Leonard Woolley, who considered it to be an early Greek trading colony, founded a little before 800 BC, in direct competition with the Phoenicians to the south. He argued that substantial amounts of Greek pottery at the site established its early Euboean connections, while the Syrian and Phoenician cooking pottery reflected a cultural mix typical of an emporium. Disappointed in not finding a Bronze-Age port, Woolley soon moved his interests to the earlier, more urbane site of Alalakh.

Woolley's critics point out that he discarded coarse undecorated utilitarian wares, and that the relative numbers of Greek, Syrian and Phoenician populations have not been established. The controversy whether Al Mina is to be regarded as a native Syrian site, with Syrian architecture and cooking pots and a Greek presence, or as an Iron Age Greek trading post, has not been resolved.

Al-Mina has been largely overlooked in popular surveys. Later work considered Al-Mina as key to understanding the role of early Greeks in the east at the outset of the Orientalizing period of Greek cultural history.

Woolley identified Al-Mina with Herodotus' Posideion, but more recent scholarship places Posideion at Ras al-Bassit. Robin Lane Fox has made a case for the Greek name of the site to have been the Potamoi Karon that is mentioned in Diodorus Siculus' account of Ptolemy I Soter's ravaging of the coastline in 312 BC; he notes its unusual word order and suggestively links it to karu, "trading post", in the inscription text of Tiglath-Pileser III's conquests, which would give "River(s) of the Trading Posts".  Woolley, on separate grounds, dated the final extinction of the Al-Mina settlement to the late fourth century BC, perhaps damaged during construction of the port of Seleucia Pieria just to the north. Lane Fox suggests instead this same voyage of coastal destruction was undertaken by Ptolemy in 312 BC.

Significance
Al-Mina served as an outpost for cultural influences that accompanied trade with Urartu and the shortest caravan route to Assyrian cities of upper Mesopotamia. Through Al-Mina and Greek traders in Cyprus the Phoenician alphabet and other technology were transmitted to Euboea and mainland Greece in the eighth century BC. Al-Mina was destroyed about 700 BC, perhaps by Sennacherib, who repressed a rebellion at Tarsos in 696 BC, but it was immediately rebuilt. Pottery recovered from later levels of the site shows that a Greek presence remained at Al-Mina through to the fourth century BC, with pottery imported from Miletus and deftly imitated locally, apparently by Greek potters.

Notes

References

——— (1990). "Al-Mina and history" Oxford Journal of Archaeology 9 pp 169–90. 
Braun, T.F.R.G. (1982). "The Greeks in the Near East" in Cambridge Ancient History III.3 (Cambridge University Press)

Coldstream, J.N. (1982). "Greeks and Phoenicians in the Aegean" and P.J. Riis "Griechen in Phönizien" in H.G. Niemeyer, Phönizier im Westen. Mainz, pp 261–72 and 237-55. 
Lane Fox, Robin (2008) Travelling Heroes in the Epic Age of Homer (New York:Knopf) In the UK Travelling Heroes: Greeks and Their Myths in the Epic Age of Homer(London: Allen Lane, Penguin Books), 2008
Lehmann, G. (2005). “Al-Mina and the East: A Report on Research in Progress,” in Alexandra Villing (ed.), The Greeks in the East. London: British Museum Research Publication vol. 157, pp. 61–92. 

——— (1953). A Forgotten Kingdom (Harmondsworth: Penguin)

See also
Cities of the ancient Near East
Short chronology timeline

Populated places established in the 9th century BC
Iron Age Greek colonies
Euboean colonies
Former populated places in Turkey
Archaeological sites in Hatay Province